Durville is a surname. Notable people with the surname include:

 Hector Durville, French occultist
 Henri Durville, son of Hector Durville

Fictional characters 
 Luke Durville, a character in the New Zealand soap opera Shortland Street

See also
 D'Urville (disambiguation)
 Jules Dumont d'Urville